Fampoux is a commune in the Pas-de-Calais department in the Hauts-de-France region of France.

Geography
The A1 autoroute passes by the village about half a mile away.

Population

Places of interest
 The Commonwealth War Graves Commission cemetery.
 The church of St. Vaast, rebuilt along with most of the village, after World War I.
 The remnants of an old chateau.

Notable people
The poet Paul Verlaine spent his holidays here for several years, as his mother's family were from Fampoux. A street and the village school bear his name.

See also
Communes of the Pas-de-Calais department

References

External links

 The CWGC cemetery at Fampoux
 South Africans buried in Fampoux British Cemetery

Communes of Pas-de-Calais